Thomas François Burgers (15 April 18349 December 1881) was a South African politician and minister who served as the 4th president of the South African Republic from 1872 to 1877. He was the youngest child of Barend and Elizabeth Burger of the farm Langefontein in the Camdeboo district of Graaff Reinet, Cape Colony.

Biography
After studying theology at the University of Utrecht in the Netherlands, Burgers became the parson of Hanover, South Africa, in 1859. A charmingly eloquent, but fiercely individualistic man, he had been influenced by Professor C. W. Opzoomer in the Netherlands and embraced his rationalist, liberal ideas.

Burgers quickly became involved in a stormy controversy with the Dutch Reformed synod over his alleged liberalism and disbelief in the literal truth of the Bible. He was critical of traditional culture and strongly emphasised knowledge and rationalism. In 1862, his unorthodox doctrine brought on him an accusation of heresy, and in 1864, he was found guilty by the Synod and suspended. The Supreme Court overturned the decision, and in 1865, he was readmitted to the ministry. Some of his liberal theological ideas and his diverting viewpoints can be found in the sketches he wrote about daily life in Hanover.

The burghers of the South African Republic urged Burgers to stand for the presidency, and he was elected by the considerable majority of 2,964 to 388 in 1872.

The South African Republic's first coins, the Burgerspond, were introduced by Burgers in 1874, responding to a demand for coinage from the populace dating back to 1853. Burgers sent a portrait of himself to his UK consul-general, who commissioned the coins to be struck at Heaton's Mint in Birmingham, England. Some people in the South African Republic objected to the issue of the Burgerspond, because the portrayal of the president on coins likened him to a dictator.

The 1905 New International Encyclopedia described Burgers's policies as president as  "characterized by brilliant but impracticable schemes, aiming chiefly at territorial expansion." One of his plans, inspired by the neighbouring Cape Prime Minister John Molteno's massive railway programme, was to build a railway linking the Transvaal to the sea. In 1875 he traveled to Europe to raise funds, but his plans were thwarted by the Pedi chief Sekhukhune, whose lands lay in the path of the proposed railway.

By 1877, Burgers was very unpopular and his government was insolvent. Britain, keen on expanding their empire, stepped in and annexed the Transvaal. Burgers retired from political life, settled in the Cape Colony again, and died in 1881, only forty-seven years old, and leaving his family destitute. Coming to the family's aid, Burgers's former private secretary, Th.M. Tromp, published the sketches Burgers had written about his experiences as minister in Hanover. The proceeds of the book, in Dutch and published in the Netherlands, were used to alleviate his family's financial problems. He was a South African Freemason. He ended his days disheartened and in poverty. His body was disinterred in 1895, to be reburied in the Pretoria cemetery now known as the Heroes' Acre.

See also
 Coins of the South African pound

Bibliography

References

Notes

Literature

Gon, Dr. Philip. “The Last Frontier War.” Military History Journal 5, no. 6. Military History Journal. The South African History Society. (December 1982). 
Grobler, Jackie. “State formation and strife, 1850-1900”  In A History of South Africa: From the Distant Past to the Present Day, edited by Fransjohan Pretorius, Pretoria: Protea Book House, 2014.
Kinsey, H.W., "The Sekukuni Wars." Military History Journal 2, no. 5. The South African Military History Society. (June 1973). http://samilitaryhistory.org/vol025hk.html

1834 births
1881 deaths
People from the Eastern Cape
Afrikaner people
Presidents of the South African Republic
Utrecht University alumni
South African Freemasons